The 1968 NCAA University Division Wrestling Championships were the 38th NCAA University Division Wrestling Championships to be held. Penn State University in State College, Pennsylvania hosted the tournament at Rec Hall.

Oklahoma State took home the team championship with 81 points and having one individual champion.

Dwayne Keller of Oklahoma State was named the Most Outstanding Wrestler and Jess Lewis of Oregon State received the Gorriaran Award.

Team results

Individual finals

References

NCAA Division I Wrestling Championship
NCAA
NCAA University Division Wrestling Championships
NCAA University Division Wrestling Championships
Wrestling competitions in the United States